Norman Williamson (born 16 January 1969) is a retired professional jockey in the Irish National Hunt. He was top jockey at the Cheltenham Festival in 1995 with 4 wins. These wins includes the Champion Hurdle on Alderbrook and the Cheltenham Gold Cup on Master Oats. He also came second in the 2000 Grand National on Melly Moss.

References

External links
 http://www.thefreelibrary.com/Norman+Williamson%3A+Williamson+reluctantly+quits+riding+after+advice...-a0109051881

Living people
Irish jockeys
1969 births